Leu-enkephalin is an endogenous opioid peptide neurotransmitter with the amino acid sequence Tyr-Gly-Gly-Phe-Leu that is found naturally in the brains of many animals, including humans. It is one of the two forms of enkephalin; the other is met-enkephalin. The tyrosine residue at position 1 is thought to be analogous to the 3-hydroxyl group on morphine. Leu-enkephalin has agonistic actions at both the μ- and δ-opioid receptors, with significantly greater preference for the latter. It has little to no effect on the κ-opioid receptor.

See also 
 Met-enkephalin

References 

Delta-opioid receptor agonists
Opioid peptides